The Coming Home Tour was the second concert tour by American actress and recording artist Kristin Chenoweth. The tour followed Chenoweth's 2014 PBS special of the same name. She was accompanied by the local symphony or philharmonic orchestra for each date and received warm reviews on the tour. The shows in 2016 placed 171st on Pollstar's annual "Top 200 North American Tours", earning $6.5 million.

Background
The title is taken from Chenoweth's live album, Coming Home, which was filmed and recorded in Broken Arrow, Oklahoma in 2014. It was Chenoweth's highest-peaking album, hitting #48 on the US charts, and after a Broadway run in On the 20th Century, she embarked on a tour. The tour was a rotating set of concerts consisting of Chenoweth being accompanied by a full symphony orchestra, a small band, and some of the world's major symphony orchestras.

Critical reception
Overall, the tour was well received by critics. Paul M. Bessel and Barbara Braswell of DC Metro Theater Arts gave the concert in North Bethesda five out of five stars. They wrote: "Chenoweth filled the hall with her remarkably strong, beautifully clear, and thrilling coloratura soprano voice. Accompanied by an ultra-talented five-piece orchestra, this petite powerhouse delighted the audience with an ever-changing kaleidoscope of pop, country, rock, gospel, and show tunes". For the show in Sarasota, Jay Handelman of the Sarasota Herald-Tribune called the show serious yet charming. He goes on to say: "I've seen a lot of Broadway artists in concert, but few are so quickly able to wrap an audience around her finger as Chenoweth did in her sold-out concert in the Van Wezel Performing Arts Hall".

Setlist
The following setlist was obtained from the March 18, 2016 concert, held at the Gaylord Performing Arts Theatre in Oklahoma City, Oklahoma. It does not represent all concerts for the duration of the tour.
"Que Sera, Sera"
"Moon River"
"The Man That Got Away"
"Taylor the Latte Boy"
"All the Things You Are"
"Fathers and Daughters" by Jodi Marr
"Bring Him Home"
"Popular"
"For Good"
"I Could Have Danced All Night"
"Over the Rainbow"
"Little Sparrow"
"The Heart of the Matter
"Upon This Rock" by Gloria Gaither
"I Was Here" by Victoria Shaw, Gary Burr and Hillary Scott
Encore
"Smile"

Tour dates

Festivals and other miscellaneous performances
Benefit concert for the ArtsBridge Foundation
New Year's Eve Celebration

Box office score data

External links
Kristin Chenoweth's Official website

References

2015 concert tours
2016 concert tours
Concert tours of the United States